OSS 117: Cairo, Nest of Spies released in France as OSS 117 : Le Caire, nid d'espions, is a 2006 French spy comedy film directed and co-written by Michel Hazanavicius in his feature film debut. It stars  Jean Dujardin, Bérénice Bejo, and Aure Atika. Set in 1955, the film follows the exploits of the French secret agent Hubert Bonisseur de La Bath / OSS 117, as he is sent to Cairo to investigate the disappearance of his best friend and fellow spy Jack Jefferson, only to stumble into a web of international intrigue.

Cairo, Nest of Spies is based on the OSS 117 novel series by Jean Bruce, but acts as a parody of the spy genre rather than a faithful adaptation, and depicts OSS 117 as an idiotic Frenchman with narrow-minded views on race, religion, and gender roles. A sequel, OSS 117: Lost in Rio, also directed by Hazanavicius and starring Dujardin, was released in 2009.

Plot
The main plot starts with the disappearances of an OSS agent, Jack Jefferson, and a Soviet cargo ship in Cairo. Agent OSS 117 is sent to investigate the events, since he and agent Jefferson share a history, shown in a short opening sequence and in flashbacks throughout the film. OSS 117 stumbles into a web of international intrigue, that involves the French, the Soviets, the British, separate factions of Egyptians, a goofy Belgian spy and even a splinter group of the Nazis from the beginning.

Throughout the film the main character has two main romantic interests. The first is an Egyptian princess Al Tarouk, who can't resist the charms of OSS 117. The second is the former assistant of Jack Jefferson, Larmina El Akmar Betouche, who at first shows no interest in the main character - and in fact temporarily becomes a secondary villain due to OSS 117's continued crass statements about her religion - but warms up to him in the end.

Cast
 Jean Dujardin as Hubert Bonisseur de La Bath, a.k.a. OSS 117
 Bérénice Bejo as Larmina el-Akmar Betouche
 Richard Sammel as Gerhard Moeller
Philippe Lefebvre as Jack Jefferson
 Aure Atika as Princess Al-Tarouk
 Claude Brosset as Armand Lesignac
 Éric Prat as Gilbert Plantieux
 François Damiens as Raymond Pelletier
 Constantin Alexandrov as Ieveni Setine
 Laurent Bateau as Nigel Gardenborough
 Said Amadis as Egyptian spokesman
 Youssef Hamid as The Imam
 Khalid Maadour as The Man Following OSS 117
 Arsène Mosca as Loktar
 Abdallah Moundy as Slimane
 Alain Khouani as the Hotel Receptionist

Production
The film is a continuation of the OSS 117 series of spy films from the 1950s and 1960s, which were in turn based on a series of novels by Jean Bruce, a prolific French popular writer. However, instead of taking the genre seriously, the film parodies the original series and other conventional spy and Eurospy films, most noticeably the early James Bond series right down to the cinematography, art direction, music and costume of the 1960s (although this is a slight anachronism as the film is stated in dialogue to be set in 1955, hence a sequence where OSS 117 briefly dances the twist is out of place). For example, driving scenes are all filmed with obvious rear projection, night scenes were clearly shot during the day with a blue filter and camera movements are simple, and avoid the three-dimensional Steadicam and crane movements that are easily accomplished today. The scene at the Cairo airport was filmed in the entrance hall of a campus of Panthéon-Assas University. Michael Hazanavicius suggested Jean Paul Belmondo for playing Armand Lesignac. He requested it and Claude Brosset played it.

The main character in the OSS 117 series is a secret agent of the Office of Strategic Services, Hubert Bonisseur de La Bath, also known by his code name OSS 117. The character is played by French actor Jean Dujardin, and he is supported in the film by Bérénice Bejo. The film's sequel is OSS 117: Lost in Rio, and Dujardin, Bejo and director Michel Hazanavicius would later reunite for the Academy Award-winning The Artist, a film that, like Cairo, Nest of Spies, pays tribute to a past genre of filmmaking.

Reception
OSS 117: Cairo, Nest of Spies received critical acclaim. The film won the Golden Space Needle award as the most popular film of the Seattle International Film Festival and the Tokyo Grand Prix award given to the best film at the Tokyo International Film Festival in 2006. It was relatively successful at the box office in France, with an attendance figure of over 2 million. Due to the film's performance, a 2009 sequel has been made titled OSS 117: Lost in Rio.

Critics outside France gave the film positive reviews. As of June, 2009, the review aggregator Rotten Tomatoes reported that 76% of critics gave the film positive reviews, based on 58 reviews, making the film a "Certified Fresh" on the website's rating system. Metacritic reported the film had an average score of 62 out of 100, based on 20 reviews. In the UK, The Guardian's Peter Bradshaw gave the film particular praise, citing a "far higher comedy-factor than the dull Get Smart, and the most lovingly detailed period pastiche since Todd Haynes's Far from Heaven."

References 
In the first scene after credits, OSS 117 makes love to a woman who turned out to be the niece of King Farouk, the last significant king of modern Egypt. (The final Egyptian king, Fuad II, reigned for only 11 months, during which time he was an infant.)

During the mission, the agent is put into an embarrassing situation where he is supposed to sing and play Oud, he sings "Bambino", originally an Italian song, composed by Giuseppe Fanciulli and wrote by Nicolas Salerno, but the famous version was performed by Cairo-born French singer Dalida, in the film, the performed version by the actor is in Algerian Arabic.

Resources

External links
Official website

2006 films
2000s spy comedy films
2000s parody films
Films directed by Michel Hazanavicius
Films set in 1945
Films set in 1955
Films set in Egypt
2000s French-language films
French spy comedy films
Films shot in Morocco
French parody films
Parody films based on James Bond films
2006 comedy films
Films scored by Ludovic Bource
2000s French films
2006 directorial debut films